Pamela Martin is an American film and television editor with more than twenty-eight feature film credits since the 1990s. She is best known for her works on The Fighter, directed by David O. Russell, earning an Academy Award nomination for Best Film Editing, and King Richard, directed by Reinaldo Marcus Green, being nominated at the Satellite Award for Best Editing and earning her second Academy Award nomination for Best Film Editing. 

Martin has been selected as a member of the American Cinema Editors and she was also a member of the dramatic jury at the Sundance Film Festival in 2007.

Filmography
Film editor
King Richard (2021)
Downhill (2020)
Seberg (2019)
Operation Finale (2018)
Battle of the Sexes (2017)
Free State of Jones (2016)
Alexander and the Terrible, Horrible, No Good, Very Bad Day (2014)
Hitchcock (2012)
Ruby Sparks (2012)
The Fighter (2010)
Youth in Revolt (2009)
Little Miss Sunshine (2006)
Weeds (2005)
Life of the Party (2005)
Saved! (2004)
Warning: Parental Advisory (2002)
Bubble Boy (2001)
How to Kill Your Neighbor's Dog (2000)
Gun Shy (2000)
Slums of Beverly Hills (1998)
Amnesia (1997)
My Perfect Journey (1997) (short film)
The House of Yes (1997)
The Substance of Fire (1996)
Ed's Next Move (1996)
Ripper (video game-1996)
Spanking the Monkey (1994)

Awards and nominations

See also
List of film director and editor collaborations – Martin has edited Spanking the Monkey (1994) and The Fighter (2010) with director David O. Russell.
List of film director and editor collaborations – Martin has edited "Battle of the Sexes" (2017), "Ruby Sparks" (2012), and "Little Miss Sunshine" (2006) with directors Jonathan Dayton and Valerie Faris.

References

Further reading
 Feature article about Martin and her editing of The Fighter.

American film editors
American Cinema Editors
American television editors
Women television editors
Living people
Place of birth missing (living people)
Year of birth missing (living people)